"Assassing" is a song by the British neo-progressive rock band Marillion. It was the second single from their second studio album, Fugazi (1984). The single reached no. 22 on the UK singles charts in May 1984. The 7" single's title track is a heavily edited version of the first track on Fugazi, with a length of 03:39 as opposed to the album version with 07:01. The B-side is the non-album track "Cinderella Search".

The lyrics of the song, which feature a narrator-character describing himself as an assassin, appear to concern character assassination. The lyrics are full of metaphors alluding to verbal fighting, for example, "unsheath the blade within the voice." The lyrics are generally interpreted as a reference to the verbal arguments that preceded band founder and drummer Mick Pointer's departure from the band. However, in the track by track breakdown of each song on the Blu Ray portion of the 2021 Deluxe Remastered Edition of the Fugazi album, Fish stated the lyrics were directed at Marillion's bass player in the band's first stable line up, Diz Minnitt.

The international 12" version contains both the full album version and the edited version of the title track; the latter is missing from the UK release. The b-side also appears in a significantly longer version.

As with all Marillion albums and singles of the Fish period, the cover art was created by Mark Wilkinson.

A CD replica of the single was also part of a collectors box-set released in July 2000 which contained Marillion's first twelve singles and was re-issued as a 3-CD set in 2009 (see The Singles '82–'88).

Track listing

7" versions

Side 1
"Assassing" [Edited version] – 3:39

Side 2
"Cinderella Search" [Edited version] – 4:19

12" versions

Side 1
"Assassing" [Full version]  – 7:01

Side 2
"Cinderella Search" [Full version] – 5:24
"Assassing" [Edited version] – 3:38 (not on UK version)

Personnel
Fish – vocals
Steve Rothery - guitars
Mark Kelly - keyboards
Pete Trewavas - bass
Ian Mosley - drums

References

1984 singles
Marillion songs
1984 songs
EMI Records singles
Songs written by Fish (singer)
Songs written by Pete Trewavas
Songs written by Mark Kelly (keyboardist)
Songs written by Steve Rothery